College of Medicine & J.N.M. Hospital is a government medical college and tertiary referral hospital under the West Bengal University of Health Sciences in Kalyani, West Bengal. The college is recognized by the National Medical Commission for MBBS and postgraduate medical degrees in selected subjects. Nursing and other para medical courses are also offered. The UG Medical Admission is done on basis of merit through National Eligibility cum Entrance Test. The yearly MBBS intake is 125 from 2019.

History 

The college and hospital are administered by the West Bengal University of Health Sciences. The college was established in 2009 and first registered with the Medical Council of India in 2010. The first batch of 100 students entered in August 2010. In 2013, Gandhi Memorial Hospital was added as second campus to this institute

Principals
 Dr. (Prof) S. Deb
 Dr. (Prof) H. Dasgupta Saha
 Dr. (Prof) Dipankar Bhattacharya
 Dr. (Prof) Santanu Banerjee
 Dr. (Prof) Subrata Chattopadhyay
 Dr. (Prof) Keshab Mukhopadhyay

Administration
The college and hospital are funded and managed by the West Bengal University of Health Sciences and the Government of West Bengal.

References

https://wbuhs.ac.in/college-of-medicine-and-jnm-hospital/

External links

Teaching hospitals in India
Medical colleges in West Bengal
Universities and colleges in Nadia district
Affiliates of West Bengal University of Health Sciences
Kalyani, West Bengal
Educational institutions established in 2009
2009 establishments in West Bengal